The House of Helfenstein was a German noble family during the High and Late Middle Ages. The family was named after the family castle, Castle Helfenstein, located above Geislingen an der Steige in the Swabian Alb region of Baden-Württemberg, Germany. The family held the rank of Graf or Count and was very significant in the 13th and 14th Centuries, but fell into financial difficulties and the family lost his estate in 1627.

Later the main branch of the family emigrated to America and even today they are successor members of this German dynasty. Currently the german-argentinean Ernst Heinrich von Helfenstein have the honorary title by inheritance of Baron and Count by subsequent to his Father.

Coat of arms

The House of Helfenstein used an elephant on their coat of arms. According to one source, the elephant is a type of Namenwappen (German: Coat of Arms from a name), in this case Helfenstein became Elefanten or elephant because of similarity between the sounds. A more fanciful source claims that the elephant comes from the first ancestor of the family, Helfrich, a citizen of Rome in 225 AD, a captain of the 5th Legion of Veterans based in Germany and the Lord of the Fils River. Helfrich acquired an elephant for his coat of arms. Their emblem depicted an elephant and was awarded in 46 BC for bravery against a charge of elephants in the Battle of Thapsus. Known locations for leg V Alaudae. Chapter One: The Counts von Helfenstein]</ref> from the Legion's emblem.

History
While the ancestral castle, Burg Helfenstein, was built around 1100 the family may originate about three centuries earlier. Ulric Helfenstein was appointed Second Provost at an earlier Blaubeuren Abbey by Charlemagne in 800. His son Rudolf was born around 820.  On 12 December 861 he founded the church at Wiesensteig. Later he also founded the Cyriasus Abbey in Wiesensteig.

It is possible that the Counts from Vils (Fils) were the ancestors of the House of Helfenstein, because in 1060 the Archbishop of Salzburg, Gebhard of Salzburg (from the Counts of Vils) was also known as Gebhard von Helfenstein. This connection is debated.

The first recorded member of the family was Eberhard the Elder, who built the ancestral castle known as Burg Helfenstein (English: Helfenstein Castle) around 1100. Helfenstein castle was located at a key point along the imperial road from Brabant to Italy. This allowed the Counts of Helfenstein to guard and tax travellers and merchants. The city of Geislingen an der Steige grew up at the foot of the castle as a toll collection station and rest stop for travellers.

Around 1200 Count Ludwig IV of Spitzenberg (near Kuchen) and Sigmaringen married the heir of Eberhard II (known as the Younger) of Helfenstein, his daughter. Through the marriage to the heir of Helfenstein family, the fortunes of both families were intertwined. The Counts of Spitzenberg were closely allied with the Holy Roman Emperor and had served the Empire in a variety of positions. Ludwig's brother, Gottfried, had marched with Frederick Barbarossa on the Third Crusade and had died on the Crusade in 1190. The Spitzenberg male line died out completely a generation later in 1226. This meant that the Helfenstein lands and the Spitzenburg lands would be combined and Ludwig IV of Spitzenburg became Ludwing I of Helfenstein. He quickly expanded his county, adding numerous holdings in the upper and middle Fils River Valley, on the highlands of the Swabian Alb, in Ulm, in Heidenheim an der Brenz as well as in the Danube River Valley near Sigmaringen and Schloss Sigmaringen.

The next significant Helfenstein count was Ulrich V, who as a member of Emperor Charles IV's household in 14th century Prague served the Emperor in many ways. The Emperor rewarded him with a marriage, which raised his social status, to Maria of Bosnia. This marriage led to many problems and caused the financial downfall of the Helfenstein family.

The collapse of the House of Hohenstaufen (Kings of Germany from 1138 to 1254) threw southern Germany into chaos. For nearly two centuries, each noble fought against the others. The Helfenstein family joined the conflicts. In 1356 Ulrich V (known as Ulrich the Elder) and his cousin Ulrich VI (known as Ulrich the Younger), split the House of Helfenstein into two lines; the Wiesensteiger and Blaubeurer branches. The Wiesensteiger branch inherited the county of Geislingen with Burg Helfenstein, but pledged the entire holding to the Free Imperial City of Ulm in 1382 for a loan. In 1396 the city called for repayment, but the House of  Helfenstein owed at least 123,439 Gulden to the city. To repay the loan, most of the County of Geislingen including the ancestral castle and 27 villages or hamlets were given to Ulm.

The Blaubeuren branch lost most of their property to the House of Württemberg in 1448 when Württemberg acquired Heidenheim. In 1450 Württemberg acquired the Wiesensteig holdings from Ulm, but lost those holdings seven years later in 1457. The Wiesensteig lands would later pass to Bavaria from 1642 until 1752. Bavaria had already owned the Blaubeuren lands including Heidenheim from  1450 until 1504, but in 1504 Bavaria gave the Blaubeuren lands to Württemberg.

Following the loss of their lands, the House of Helfenstein lost all political power. The last male member of the family died in 1627 in Wiesensteig, which signified the end of this family name.

The Helfenstein family later moved to Salzburg to become part of the "Salzburgers" arriving at the Georgia Colony 1734. One branch of the family 'Latinised' their name to Helveston. During the American Revolution Philip Helveston with family fought as notable rebel's and were routed and driven away in the battle of Ebenezer Georgia by British regulars. In 1782 they resettled in the Mississippi territory now known as Alabama. Another branch of the family, descended from Nichel Helfenstein who emigrated to Philadelphia in 1739, Anglicised their family name to Helvenston.

Rulers

House of Helfenstein

Partitions of Helfenstein under Helfenstein rule

Table of rulers

Members

Counts
 Eberhard I the Elder (fl.1100)
 Eberhard II the Younger (fl.1200)
 Ulrich II (d.17 V 1294), m. Agnes von Tübingen

Helfenstein-Wiesensteigen branch
 Ulrich V the Elder (d.7 IV 1372) m. Maria of Bosnia (1333–1403)
 Ulrich VIII (d.1375)
 Friedrich I d. 20 VIII 1438) m. Agnes von Weisberg
 Friedrich II (1408–1483) m. Agnes von Eberstein (d.1456) and Irmgard von Helfenstein-Blaubeuren 
 Ludwig (21 XI 1447 – 27 XII 1493) m. Elisabeth von Limpurg-Speckfeld (1466–1538)
 Friedrich III (III 1479–1502) m. Barbara von Rechberg (d.15 IV 1522)
 Ludwig I Helfrich (1480-17 IV 1525) m. Margarethe von Eddelsheim (1480-VI 1537)
 Ulrich XI (1490-26 V 1548), m. Katharina von Waldburg-Sonnenberg (21 X 1495-14 X 1563)
 Ulrich XIII (8 II 1524 – 17 I 1570) m. Katharina von Monfort (d.26 XII 1594)

Helfenstein-Blaubeuren branch

 Ulrich VI the Younger (d.13 V 1361) m. Beatrix von Schlüsselberg (d. 24 I 1355)
 Ulrich VII (d. 1375) m. Anna of Oettingen (d.1360)
Johann II (d. 27 II 1444) m. Irmgard von Kirchberg (d.3 III 1444)
Ulrich X
Anna (1430-6 XI 1472) m. Wilhelm II von Castell (1425-7 VIII 1479)
Konrad II (d. 14 XII 1474) m. Anna von Seckendorf (d. 23 XI 1474)
Georg I (d.1517) m. Cecilia of Truchtelfingen (1) and Elisabeth von Limpurg-Speckfeld (2) (1466–1538)
Ursula (1496–1576)
Magdalena  (b.1497)
Wilhelm (b.1498)
Agatha (b.1502)
Dorothea (b.1503)
Wilhelm (b.1506)
Anna
Irmgard m. Friedrich II von Helfenstein-Wiesensteigen (1408–1483)(view above)
Hans IV (d.1483)
Ursula 
Bernhard (d.1501)
Ernst (d.XI 1483)
Wolfgang
Cecilia
Magdalena
Friedrich 
Sibylla (d. 11 V 1487)
Christoph
Anna
Anna 
Agnes m. Heinrich von Rechberg
 Wulfhild 
 Georg II von Helfenstein (7 XI 1518-17 XI 1573) m. Maria de Bowart (d.1565) and Apollonia von Zimmern-Mösskirch (1547 – 31 VII 1604) 
 Schweikhard von Helfenstein (26 VI 1539–1599) m. Maria von Hohenzollern (28 VIII 1544 – 13 XII 1611)

Other
 Adelheid von Helfenstein (fl.1356)
 Irmel von Helfenstein (fl.1444)
 Barbara von Helfenstein (1552–1605)
 Magdalena von Helfenstein (1562–1622)
 Katharina von Helfenstein (1563–1627)

See also
 Castle Helfenstein

References

 Altertumsverein Geislingen (Steige): Helfenstein. Geschichtliche Mitteilungen von Geislingen und Umgebung, 12. Heft, Geislingen (Steige), 1949 
 Heinz Bühler: Richinza von Spitzenberg und ihr Verwandtenkreis. Ein Beitrag zur Geschichte der Grafen von Helfenstein, in: Württembergisch Franken, Heft 58, 1974 
 Hugo Glökler: Rund um den Helfenstein. Eine Heimatkunde von Stadt und Bezirk Geislingen-Steige, Geislingen (Steige), 1954 
 Heinrich Friedrich Kerler: Geschichte der Grafen von Helfenstein – nach den Quellen dargestellt, Ulm, 1840 
 Karl Putz: Unsere Heimat rund um Geislingen-Steige, Geislingen (Steige), 1935 
 Wilhelm Karl Prinz zu Isenburg, Frank Baron Freytag von Loringhoven, Detlev Schwennicke (Hrsg.): Europäische Stammtafeln. Stammtafeln zur Geschichte der europäischen Staaten – Schwaben, Band 12, Marburg, 1992 

 Philippa Gregory: The Virgin's Lover.

External links

 Grafen von Helfenstein
 Family Tree of the Counts von Helfenstein based on work by H.F. Kerler

Helfenstein, House of